Alfred Kubel (25 May 1909 in Braunschweig – 22 May 1999 in Bad Pyrmont) was a German politician; in his later career, he was a member of the Social Democratic Party of Germany (SPD).

In 1928, after attending Middle School, Kubel became an industrial clerk. In 1925, Kubel became a member of Internationaler Sozialistischer Kampfbund, a left-wing political party. During that time, he also joined a trade union. Starting in 1933, he became active in resistance to the Nazis. Kubel was arrested in 1937 and was convicted to a one-year prison term for preparation of high treason. He was drafted into the Volkssturm, a branch of the military, in 1944, and deserted soon thereafter.

In May 1946, after having joined the Social Democratic Party of Germany, Kubel was appointed prime minister of Braunschweig by the British occupation forces; he held this position until the state was merged into Lower Saxony in November 1946. From 1951 to 1955 and from 1957 to 1970, he held various cabinet-level positions in the government of Lower Saxony. As minister, he also served on the Volkswagen Group's advisory board from 1965 to 1970.

Kubel was Minister President of Lower Saxony from 1970 to 1976; as such, he served as President of the Bundesrat in 1974/75.

References 
 Biography at the Lower Saxon Ministry of Agriculture

External links 
Literature by Kubel
 

1909 births
1999 deaths
Presidents of the German Bundesrat
Politicians from Braunschweig
Social Democratic Party of Germany politicians
Grand Crosses 1st class of the Order of Merit of the Federal Republic of Germany
Ministers-President of Lower Saxony
Ministers of the Lower Saxony State Government
Volkssturm personnel
Deserters

German resistance to Nazism